Kusangan (also Romanized as Kūsangān; also known as Gūsangān and Gūsengān) is a village in Javid-e Mahuri Rural District, in the Central District of Mamasani County, Fars Province, Iran. At the 2006 census, its population was 287, in 61 families.

References 

Populated places in Mamasani County